The Constitution Act, 1871 (UK), 34 & 35 Vict, c 28, (the Act) is an Act of the Parliament of the United Kingdom and forms part of the Constitution of Canada. It was originally known as the British North America Act, 1871, but it was renamed by the Constitution Act, 1982.

Parliament's powers in relation to the territories 

Section 4 provides that the Parliament of Canada "may from time to time make provision for the administration, peace, order and good government of any territory not for the time being included in any Province". There are currently three territories which are part of Canada, but which are not part of any province: the Northwest Territories, Nunavut and Yukon.

Establishment of new provinces 

Section 2 has likely been replaced by paragraph 42(1)(e) of the Constitution Act, 1982, which provides that an amendment to the Constitution of Canada under the general amending procedure is required to establish a new province "notwithstanding any existing law or practice".

Alteration of provincial boundaries 

Section 3 provides that the Parliament of Canada "may from time to time, with the consent of the Legislature of any Province of the said Dominion, increase, diminish, or otherwise alter the limits of such Province, upon such terms and conditions as may be agreed upon to by the said Legislature, and may, with the like consent, make provision respecting the effect and operation of any such increase or diminution or alteration of territory in relation to any Province affected thereby".

French version 

Since the Constitution Act, 1871 was enacted in English, there is no official French version of the Act. Section 55 of the Constitution Act, 1982 requires the Minister of Justice to prepare a translation of the Act and that it be brought forward for enactment. Although a translation was prepared in 1990, it has not been brought forward for enactment.

See also 
Full text of the Constitution Act, 1871.

References

Constitution of Canada
Acts of the Parliament of the United Kingdom concerning Canada